Bald Point State Park is a Florida State Park located south of Ochlockonee Bay, approximately seven miles southeast of Panacea, on St. James Island in Alligator Point, Tallahassee's closest beach, off U.S. 98, in Franklin County northwestern Florida. The address is 146 Box Cut. Park was named after Bald Point cape on eastern tip of St. James Island in Ochlockonee Bay.

The first land in Bald Point State Park,  primarily along the shore of Apalachee Bay, was purchased by the state in 1999. A major expansion of the park occurred in 2002 when Florida purchased  of land from St. Joe Company for $10.3 million. The purchased land was on Ochlockonee Bay, east of the Crooked River (Florida) in Franklin County, Florida.

Recreational Activities
The park has such amenities as beaches, bicycling, birding, canoeing, fishing, hiking, kayaking, swimming and wildlife viewing.

Gallery

References

External links
 Bald Point State Park at Florida State Parks
 Bald Point State Park at Visit Florida
 Nature Tourism - Bald Point State Park - State Extension Service site

Parks in Franklin County, Florida
State parks of Florida